Banegas is a Spanish/Italian surname. Notable people with the surname include:

Ángel Darío Banegas (born 1969), Honduran cartoonist and politician
Cristina Banegas (born 1948), Argentine actress

Spanish-language surnames
Italian-language surnames